KWXY (1340 AM) is a commercial radio station licensed to Cathedral City, California, and serving the Palm Springs radio market in the Coachella Valley. The station was founded in 1964 and is owned by Louie Comella, through licensee IVOX RADIO LLC. Studios, offices and the transmitter are on Dinah Shore Drive.

Programming is simulcast on 99-watt FM translator station K222DA at 92.3 MHz.

History
The station previously simulcast on 1340 AM but sold the AM frequency to Ric and Rozene Supple's R&R Radio Corporation of Palm Springs, who flipped the format from its original beautiful music format to progressive talk on August 7, 2006 and changed the call sign to KPTR, making it the area's first Air America Radio affiliate. The network went bankrupt October 13, 2006 but had resumed operation under new ownership until it ultimately shut down in January 2010 and filed for liquidation.

KWXY not only had the same format since its inception in October 1964 but the same owner as well. KWXY was owned by veteran broadcaster Glen Barnett (1924-2014), a broadcast engineer who actually built and wired the studios and transmitter and most recently was the station's general manager.

KWXY (AM) began in 1964 as a 24-hour, 250-watt AM station. Power was increased to 500 watts in 1968 and again to 1 kW in 1973, where it remains today. FM operations began in 1969 at 103.1 MHz with a 3 kW signal. The move to 98.5 MHz and a boost to 50 kW occurred in 1976.

Both full-time residents of the Coachella Valley as well as seasonal visitors from the northern part of the United States and Canada made KWXY one of the most successful stations in the area both in demographics as well as revenue. In addition, the on-air lineup boasted Dave Hull, named one of the top ten greatest broadcasters in Los Angeles radio history, and his KFI colleague Scott Ellsworth. KWXY also broadcast news reports from Canada for Canadian citizens who visit the Coachella Valley during the winter season.

In January 2010, it was announced that KWXY-FM would cease broadcasting on 98.5 FM and broadcast only on the 1340 AM frequency. Dave Hull signed off the FM station at 11:59 pm February 1. KDES, another R&R Broadcasting station originally broadcasting at 104.7, had taken over the 98.5 frequency allocation and currently carries the Alpha Media "The Bull" contemporary country music format. Licensing of the 104.7 frequency then moved from Palm Springs to Riverside.

In June 2014, the station began simulcasting on KDES-HD2 and on a leased FM translator at 107.3 and changed its branding to "Legend 107.3: The Sound of the Desert". The branding was later amended to "107.3 MOD-FM".

In November 2015, KWXY changed to a syndicated liberal talk format while the programming rights to its previous standards format and the 107.3 translator (due to a sale to Alpha Media) moved to KDES-HD2 as Mod 107.3 FM but continued to play classic songs from The Great American Songbook as well as easy listening favorites, but no instrumentals. Many of the songs on the original format were in fact instrumental and even today, the station retains its original collection of tapes on the 10" NAB format.

On August 12, 2016, KWXY and sister station KPSI (now KKGX) went silent. In October 2016, Desert Broadcasters agreed to acquire both stations from R&R Radio Corporation.

On March 14, 2017, KWXY returned to the air as "Relaxing Music 1340" and once again aired an Adult Standards music format. The sale to Desert Broadcasters was consummated on March 31, 2017. A simulcast on FM translator K222DA (92.3 FM) was added on April 23, 2018. On August 4, 2020, KWXY's website hinted that a change was happening on the station. It was unknown at the time if the format would be changed. The station began running liners saying "Change is coming to KWXY and we think you're going to like it". On August 13, KWXY announced that their FM translator K222DA 92.3 raised its power from 60 watts to 99 watts.

Effective June 9, 2021, Desert Broadcasters sold KWXY, KKGX and two translators to Louie Comella's IVOX RADIO LLC for $105,000. The sale included the old KDES (AM) tower site in Palm Springs for $220,000 and the original KWXY "Broadcast Center" building for $550,000. The Broadcast Center building on its 28.4 acres (11.36 ha) will be expanded to become the new home of the IVOX+ streaming platform as well as a future independent motion picture studio lot and theater venue.   Both stations were off the air for four months beginning in August while equipment was repaired and upgraded. At noon on December 12, 2021, they returned to the air with a four-hour special, "Frank Sinatra: Remembering An American Legend," hosted by Wink Martindale. Following the special, both stations began playing Christmas music. On December 27, KWXY relaunched as "KWXY Music Radio," playing a mix of standards, big band, jazz and rock 'n' roll of the 1940s through the 1970s. In addition to Martindale who hosts The Wink Martindale Show six days a week, KWXY hosts programming with a variety of styles and genres including rockabilly artist The Reverend Horton Heat, concert promoter Tom Ingram, big band expert Rob Dehlinger, national radio and television personality John Tesh, drummer Gabriel Villa of Chicano Batman, guitarist Mark Kendall of Great White, punk singer Keith "Monkey" Warren of The Adicts, American music historian Eddie Trunk and remastered broadcasts of The Wolfman Jack Show.

Regional hosts include longtime Los Angeles personality M.G. Kelly, Uli Bella, a founding member of Ozomatli and Los Angeles disc jockeys Mike Czech and Malcolm Ryker with their show, Skratch n Sniff.

Current and upcoming local personalities include Patrick Evans of KESQ-TV, Motown musician Alvin Taylor and former longtime KPLM afternoon drive personality Ralph Squillace.      

Work is underway by owner Louie Comella in association with entertainment venues and music festivals on a television series showcasing both established and emerging artists.  The program will originate in a new studio inside the historic Cathedral City station building.

As of February 15, KWXY streams worldwide via kwxy.com and IVOX RADIO.

Previous logo

References

External links 

KWXY FM fan site with Don Wardell show transcriptions
Aircheck of KWXY FM final sign off Feb. 2, 2010

WXY
Mass media in Riverside County, California
Cathedral City, California
Radio stations established in 1964
1964 establishments in California
Variety radio stations in the United States